Alisa Sayanovna Zhambalova (born 13 September 1994) is a Russian cross-country skier who competes internationally.

Early and personal life
Zhambalova was born on 13 September 1994 in Sagan-Nur in the Republic of Buryatia, Russia. She represented Russia at the 2012 Winter Youth Olympics in Innsbruck.

Skiing career
Zhambalova made her FIS Cross-Country World Cup debut on 1 February 2013, and competed for Russia at the 2017 FIS Nordic World Ski Championships in Lahti, Finland. She competed at the 2018 Winter Olympics in Pyeongchang, representing OAR. She also competed at the FIS Nordic World Ski Championships 2019.

Cross-country skiing results
All results are sourced from the International Ski Federation (FIS).

Olympic Games

World Championships

World Cup

Season standings

References

External links

1994 births
Living people
Sportspeople from Buryatia
Russian female cross-country skiers
Tour de Ski skiers
Cross-country skiers at the 2018 Winter Olympics
Olympic cross-country skiers of Russia
Universiade gold medalists for Russia
Universiade medalists in cross-country skiing
Competitors at the 2019 Winter Universiade
Cross-country skiers at the 2012 Winter Youth Olympics